The 2021–22 season was Al-Fayha's 68th year in their existence and their first season back in the Pro League following their promotion from the MS League in the previous season. The club participated in the Pro League and the King Cup.

The season covered the period from 1 July 2021 to 30 June 2022.

Players

Squad information

Out on loan

Transfers and loans

Transfers in

Loans in

Transfers out

Loans out

Pre-season

Competitions

Overview

Goalscorers

Last Updated: 19 May 2022

Assists

Last Updated: 7 May 2022

Clean sheets

Last Updated: 23 June 2022

References

Al-Fayha FC seasons
Fayha